Tricolia pulchella is a species of small sea snail with calcareous opercula, a marine gastropod mollusk in the family Phasianellidae, the pheasant snails.

Description
The shell grows to a height of 7 mm.

Habitat
This species is found in the following habitats:
 Brackish
 Marine

Distribution
This species occurs in the Mediterranean Sea and in the Black Sea.

References

External links
 To Biodiversity Heritage Library (3 publications)
 To World Register of Marine Species

Phasianellidae